Lyudmyla Kichenok and Makoto Ninomiya defeated Caroline Dolehide and Storm Sanders in the final, 6–4, 6–7(3–7), [10–8], to win the women's doubles tennis title at the 2021 Nottingham Open. Though it was their first title together as a team, it marked Kichenok's fifth career doubles title on the WTA Tour and Ninomiya's third.

Desirae Krawczyk and Giuliana Olmos were the defending champions from when the tournament was last held in 2019, but they did not return to compete.

Seeds

Draw

Draw

References

External Links 
Main Draw

Nottingham Open – Doubles
2021 Women's Doubles